Sebastian Ohlsson (born 26 May 1993) is a Swedish professional footballer who plays as a right-back for Allsvenskan club IFK Göteborg.

Career statistics

Club

References

External links
 
 

1993 births
Living people
Association football wingers
Swedish footballers
Allsvenskan players
2. Bundesliga players
IFK Göteborg players
Örgryte IS players
FC St. Pauli players
Footballers from Gothenburg
Expatriate footballers in Germany
Swedish expatriate sportspeople in Germany